= The Old Demon =

"The Old Demon" is a short story by Pearl S. Buck set during the Second Sino-Japanese War. It was first published in the February 1939 issue of Cosmopolitan magazine. The hero of the story is an elderly Chinese woman who sacrifices herself to save her village.

== Plot ==
A frail, elderly widow named Mrs. Wang harnesses the power of a river to save her village. She calls the river "the old demon" because it took the life of her husband when he was young. While others flee the village to escape bombing by Japanese warplanes, she heroically stays back and opens the dike, flooding the village and drowning the invaders – as well as herself.

== Collections ==
- The story has been published by Creative Co. in 1981 with ISBN 0-87191-828-5, illustrated by Sandra Higashii .
